Avian coronavirus is a species of virus from the genus Gammacoronavirus that infects birds; since 2018, all gammacoronaviruses which infect birds have been classified as this single species. The strain of avian coronavirus previously known as infectious bronchitis virus (IBV) is the only coronavirus that infects chickens. It causes avian infectious bronchitis, a highly infectious disease that affects the respiratory tract, gut, kidney and reproductive system. IBV affects the performance of both meat-producing and egg-producing chickens and is responsible for substantial economic loss within the poultry industry. The strain of avian coronavirus previously classified as Turkey coronavirus causes gastrointestinal disease in turkeys.

Classification
IBV is in the genus Gammacoronavirus, or group 3, with a non-segmented, positive-sense single-stranded RNA genome.

It was previously the type species of its genus Igacovirus. When there was only one genus of coronaviruses, the genus Coronavirus, it was the type species of the group of all known coronaviruses.

Recombination

When two strains of coronavirus IBV infect a host they may recombine during genome replication. Recombination appears to contribute to the genetic variation of the IBV genome found in nature.

Pathology

Respiratory system 
When inhaled, virus will attach to glycoprotein receptors containing sialic acid on ciliated epithelial cells of the respiratory epithelium. The respiratory replication will result in loss of ciliary activity,  mucus accumulation, necrosis and desquamation, causing respiratory distress, râles and asphyxia. Local virus replication will result in viremia, spreading the infection into other tissues and organs. Other respiratory diseases of chickens (Mycoplasma gallisepticum, avian infectious laryngotracheitis (Gallid alphaherpesvirus 1), Newcastle disease (avian paramyxovirus 1), Avian metapneumovirus infection may be confused clinically to infectious bronchitis.

Kidney 
Through viremia, some nephrotropic strains (most of high virulence) could infect the kidney epithelium in tubules and nephron, causing kidney failure. At gross examination, kidneys may appear swollen and pale in color and with urates in ureters

Reproductive system 
In hens, the viremic IBV will also reach the oviduct, causing lesions in the magnum (the egg-white gland) and in the uterus (the egg-shell gland), leading to a sharp decline of egg production, shell-less, fragile or roughened shells eggs (uterus lesion) with watery whites (magnum lesion). Infection of chickens at puberty, during the oviduct development, will impede oviduct formation and destroy future laying capacity, resulting in "false layers". However, other diseases affecting layer chickens could lead to that condition.

Vaccines 
There are both attenuated vaccines and inactivated vaccines available. Their effectiveness is diminished by poor cross-protection. The nature of the protective immune response to IBV is poorly understood, but the surface spike protein, the amino-terminal S1 half, is sufficient to induce good protective immunity. Experimental vector IB vaccines and genetically manipulated IBVs—with heterologous spike protein genes—have produced promising results, including in the context of in ovo vaccination.

See also
Infectious bronchitis virus D-RNA
Veterinary virology

References

Further reading

Poultry diseases
Animal viral diseases
Gammacoronaviruses
Viral respiratory tract infections